Cataxia is a genus of Australian armored trapdoor spiders that was first described by William Joseph Rainbow in 1914.

Species
 it contains fifteen species:
Cataxia babindaensis Main, 1969 – Australia (Queensland)
Cataxia barrettae Rix, Bain, Main & Harvey, 2017 – Australia (Western Australia)
Cataxia bolganupensis (Main, 1985) – Australia (Western Australia)
Cataxia colesi Rix, Bain, Main & Harvey, 2017 – Australia (Western Australia)
Cataxia cunicularis (Main, 1983) – Australia (Queensland)
Cataxia dietrichae Main, 1985 – Australia (Queensland)
Cataxia eungellaensis Main, 1969 – Australia (Queensland)
Cataxia maculata Rainbow, 1914 (type) – Australia (Queensland)
Cataxia melindae Rix, Bain, Main & Harvey, 2017 – Australia (Western Australia)
Cataxia pallida (Rainbow & Pulleine, 1918) – Australia (Queensland)
Cataxia pulleinei (Rainbow, 1914) – Australia (Queensland, New South Wales)
Cataxia sandsorum Rix, Bain, Main & Harvey, 2017 – Australia (Western Australia)
Cataxia spinipectoris Main, 1969 – Australia (Queensland)
Cataxia stirlingi (Main, 1985) – Australia (Western Australia)
Cataxia victoriae (Main, 1985) – Australia (Victoria)

See also
 List of Idiopidae species

References

Further reading

Idiopidae
Mygalomorphae genera
Spiders of Australia
Taxa named by William Joseph Rainbow